Teatro Sérgio Cardoso is a theatre in São Paulo, Brazil. It has nearly 900 seats and was inaugurated in 1980.

References

Theatres in São Paulo
1980 establishments in Brazil